Lord Walter Charles Gordon-Lennox,  (29 July 1865 – 21 October 1922) was a British Conservative Party politician. He served as Treasurer of the Household from 1891 to 1892 under Lord Salisbury.

Background
Gordon-Lennox was the youngest of the four sons of Charles Gordon-Lennox, 6th Duke of Richmond, by his wife Frances Harriett Greville, daughter of Algernon Greville. He was educated at Eton and Christ Church, Oxford.

Political career
Gordon-Lennox entered Parliament in 1888 as Member of Parliament for Chichester, a seat he held until 1894. In 1891 he was sworn of the Privy Council and appointed Treasurer of the Household under Lord Salisbury, a post he retained until the government fell the following year.

Family
Gordon-Lennox married Alice Ogilvie-Grant, daughter of The Honourable George Henry Ogilvie-Grant and granddaughter of Francis Ogilvy-Grant, 6th Earl of Seafield, on 6 July 1889. They had at least one child, Victor Charles Hugh Gordon-Lennox (1897–1967). Gordon-Lennox died in October 1922, aged 57. Lady Walter Gordon-Lennox died in March 1946, aged 90.

References

1865 births
1922 deaths
UK MPs 1886–1892
UK MPs 1892–1895
Conservative Party (UK) MPs for English constituencies
Younger sons of dukes
Treasurers of the Household
Members of the Privy Council of the United Kingdom
People educated at Eton College
Alumni of Christ Church, Oxford